Indrapura is the second-installment of an epic trilogy and the tenth major production of Magwayen, the premiere theater group of Pamantasan ng Lungsod ng Maynila in the Philippines. It debuted on stage on December 9, 2006 at the Justo Albert Auditorium at the PLM Main Campus.

Plot
Indrapura chronicles the tragic love affair of Lilagretha and Elindro. In the story, Sulayman decided to adopt his late brother's daughter Lilasari, concealing the fact that she was the rightful heir to the throne of the Sultanate of Indrapura. Lilagretha, the biological daughter of Sulayman discovered this secret on her 20th birthday and she began feeling threatened about her place as Sultana of Indrapura. Her jealousy sparked when Elindro, her love interest, became attracted to Lilasari. From then on, the two sisters became sworn rivals. With the help of the evil sorceress, Tarsila, Lilagretha attempted to kill Lilasari but she failed and her plot was later revealed. Lilagretha was sentenced to death, however, Lilasari forgave her and secured her freedom.

Cast
 renato isidro "tilasaro
 Teresa Tan as Lilasari
 Paula Montano as Tarsila
 Michael Cayetano as Elindro
 Byron Barinuevo as Sulayman
 Jeselle Diaz as Soraya
 Ampol Velasco as Andravari
 Marvin Avila as Rajavari
 Marvin Hilario as Punong Kawal

Productions
The play was written by Marlon Miguel and directed by John Borgy Danao, the same people behind the full-length musical play, Bidasari. It also brought together the endearing music of Carlo Yanesa, the colorful costumes made by Mary Lyn Buguina and Ronald Decena, the state of the art Production Design by Jay Parilla, the outstanding Artist Coaching of Michael Flororita, and the Marketing Genius of Real Florido.

References

External links
 PLM Official University website
 PLM Official Student Publication website
 Magwayen Geocities site
 Love-epic Indrapura on-stage
 X (Eks) to be staged at Pamantasan ng Lungsod ng Maynila
 PLM Geocities site
 Association of South East Asian Institutes of Learning
 Wikipedia Map
 Indrapura AVP

2006 plays
Philippine plays
Pamantasan ng Lungsod ng Maynila